"Why I Love You" is the third single from B2K their self-titled debut album and the song was released in May 2002 and it peaked at number 73 on the Billboard Hot 100 and number 19 on the Hot R&B/Hip-Hop Songs. The song is also featured on the group's second album, Pandemonium!.

Music video
Directed by Erik White, the video shows the guys are playing at a basketball court with their label mates IMx wearing the original Laker jerseys and Omarion is singing to the late Naya Rivera  in the basketball court as she walks away from him. The guys are also wearing jean jackets unbuttoned all the way to the bottom showing their bodies. In another scene, the guys put on a show outside wearing matching red and black leather jackets. There are also scenes of Lil' Fizz sitting down singing the chorus with recording artist Jhené (who at the time was marketed as his cousin and makes a cameo as his girlfriend), while they are sitting down on the bleachers with rottweilers. TG4,  IMx and actress Kat Graham make cameos as well.

Weekly charts

References

2002 singles
2002 songs
2000s ballads
B2K songs
Epic Records singles
Contemporary R&B ballads
Music videos directed by Erik White